Taekwondo competitions at the 2000 Summer Olympics in Sydney were held from September 27 to September 30. There were four weight categories for both men and women. Each NOC could enter 2 men and 2 women, but only 1 athlete per weight category. There was one global Olympic Qualification Tournament and one qualification tournament for each continent. In addition, 4 invitational places were awarded.

Timeline

Qualification summary

Men's events

−58 kg

−68 kg

−80 kg

+80 kg

Women's events

−49 kg

−57 kg

−67 kg

+67 kg

References

External links
 World Taekwondo Federation

Qualification for the 2000 Summer Olympics
2000
Olympic Qualification
Qualification